The River Oaks Courts, located at 14349 TX 16 in Medina, Texas, United States, were added to the National Register of Historic Places on January 28, 2019.

See also
 National Register of Historic Places listings in Bandera County, Texas
 Medina River Oaks Courts Property website

References

National Register of Historic Places in Texas